Krutikov, feminine: Krutikova is a surname. Notable people with the surname include:

Anatoly Krutikov (1933–2019), Russian footballer and manager
Georgy Krutikov (1899–1958), Russian architect and artist
Alexey Krutikov (disambiguation), multiple people
Mikhail Krutikov, Russian sports sailor
, American philologist

See also

Russian-language surnames